Stroucken is a surname. Notable people with the surname include:

Albert P.L. Stroucken (born 1947), Dutch businessman
Jacques Stroucken (1884–1975), Dutch painter